Ita or ITA may refer to :

Places and jurisdictions 
 ITA, ISO 3166-1 country code for Italy
 Ita (Africa), an ancient city and former bishopric in Roman Mauretania, presently a Latin Catholic titular see
 Itá, Paraguay

People 
 Ita (princess), Egyptian princess
 Ita Buttrose (born 1942), Australian journalist and businesswoman
 Ita Ever (born 1931), Estonian actress
 Ita Saks (1921–2003), Estonian translator and publicist
 Ita Wegman (1876–1943), Dutch co-founder of Anthroposophical Medicine
 Ida of Lorraine (11th century – 1113), mother of Godfrey of Bouillon
 Íte of Killeedy (c.480–c.570), Irish nun and saint

Language 
 Initial Teaching Alphabet, a phonetic alphabet system formerly used in British, and some American, schools to teach children to read
 Italian language, by ISO 639-2 language code
 International Telegraph Alphabet, also known as Baudot code

Organizations and alliances 

 Independent Television Authority, the regulator for commercial television in the UK from 1954 until 1972
 Independent Testing Authority, a certified voting system test laboratory
 Indian Television Academy, organization that administers the Indian Television Academy Awards
 Information Technology Agreement, a treaty on tariff regulation with a committee under the World Trade Organisation
 Institute of Technology Assessment, a research unit of the Austrian Academy of Sciences, Vienna
 Instituto Tecnológico de Aeronáutica or Technological Institute of Aeronautics, a Brazilian engineering college
 Integrated Transport Authority, the UK organisation overseeing Passenger Transport Executives
 Intercollegiate Tennis Association, an organization of coaches and collegiate tennis players
 International Tape Association, former name of the International Recording Media Association
 International Technology Alliance, a research program initiated by the UK Ministry of Defence and the US Army Research Laboratory
 International Testing Agency, an independent anti-doping organisation
 International Track Association,  an American professional track and field league of the mid-1970s
 International Trade Administration, an agency of the United States Department of Commerce
 Italian Trade Agency , an agency of the Italian Republic that fosters the export of Italian products
 International Trombone Association
 International Tunneling and Underground Space Association
 ITA - Italia Trasporto Aereo, an Italian airline that replaced Alitalia
 ITA Software, a travel industry software company acquired by Google in 2011
 ITA Transportes Aéreos, a Brazilian airline

Other uses 
 Cyclone Ita, April 2014, Solomon Islands
 Internal thoracic artery, a blood vessel in the thorax
 Involuntary Treatment Act, refers to Washington State Involuntary Treatment Act or to a patient under such act
 Indonesian Television Awards, annual Indonesian TV awards broadcast on MNC Media
 [ita], a counterpart to &lsqb;sic&rsqb;, Latin for "thus" or "just as", is inserted after quoted text to indicate it has been transcribed exactly as found in the source text, complete with any errors.

See also 
 Aeta, an ethnic group in the Philippine Islands
 Ité palm, Mauritia flexuosa, a palm tree
 Itta (592–652), wife of Pepin I

Estonian feminine given names